Nicole Arendt and Kristine Radford were the defending champions and successfully defended their title, by defeating Kerry-Anne Guse and Andrea Strnadová 6–2, 6–2 in the final.

Seeds

Draw

Draw

References

External links
 Official results archive (ITF)
 Official results archive (WTA)

Danamon Open
1994 WTA Tour